Sunday Life was a British magazine/discussion television programme broadcast on Sundays on BBC One, beginning 20 April 2008, presented by Louise Minchin and Colin Jackson. The show, which replaced the Heaven and Earth Show was intended to focus on "inspiring stories and thought-provoking discussion", with the slogan "Real stories. Real people. Real life." The show was partly intended to fill the public service remit of the BBC's broadcasting licence, as well as its Sunday morning religious quota.  It was dropped from the schedule after one series and its slot in the schedule replaced by The Big Questions.

The show was produced by True North Productions, who are based in Leeds.

The location for the show was in Keighley, West Yorkshire, at the old Mills which were renovated.

References

External links
 
 Sunday Life at True North Productions

BBC Television shows
British religious television series
2008 British television series debuts
2008 British television series endings
BBC high definition shows
2000s British television miniseries
English-language television shows